The 2003 NCAA Division III women's basketball tournament was the 22nd annual tournament hosted by the NCAA to determine the national champion of Division III women's collegiate basketball in the United States. Trinity (TX) defeated Eastern Connecticut State in the championship game, 60–58, to claim the Tigers' first Division III national title. The championship rounds were hosted by Rose–Hulman Institute of Technology in Terre Haute, Indiana.

Bracket

Final Four

All-tournament team
 Allison Wooley, Trinity (TX)
 Megan Selmon, Trinity (TX)
 Allison Coleman, Eastern Connecticut State
 Kristi Channing, Wisconsin–Eau Claire
 Kelly Wescott, Rochester (NY)

See also
 2003 NCAA Division I women's basketball tournament
 2003 NCAA Division II women's basketball tournament
 2003 NAIA Division I women's basketball tournament
 2003 NAIA Division II women's basketball tournament
 2003 NCAA Division III men's basketball tournament

References

 
NCAA Division III women's basketball tournament
2003 in sports in Indiana
Trinity Tigers
Eastern Connecticut State Warriors